Patti Rhodes is a pornographic film director and producer. She is a member of the AVN Hall of Fame.

Partial filmography as a director
Marina Vice (1985)
Swedish Erotica Featurettes 1 (1989)
Rainwoman 3 (1990)
Blow Job Betty  (1991)
Afterhours (2005)
Frosty's Dad in Action (1990)

Partial filmography as a producer
Lust Italian Style (1987)
Taboo 13  (1994)
Teri Weigel: Centerfold (1998)
Fire and Ice (2000)
The Girl Next Door 1  (2004)
Ackland uses clay(2007)

References

American pornographic film directors
American pornographic film producers
Women pornographic film producers
Women pornographic film directors
Year of birth missing (living people)
Living people
Film directors from Los Angeles